Hakea pachyphylla  is a flowering plant in the family Proteaceae and is endemic to the upper Blue Mountains in New South Wales. It is a small shrub with stiff, needle-shaped leaves and clusters of yellow flowers. Formerly thought to be a  Blue Mountains form of Hakea propinqua.

Description
The inflorescence consists of 1-7 yellow flowers that appear in axillary clusters in spring.
 The small branches are ribbed and densely covered with soft mid-red matted hairs quickly becoming smooth or on occasion remain until flowering.

Taxonomy and naming
Hakea pachyphylla was first formally described in 1827 by Curt Sprengel from an unpublished description by Franz Sieber in Systema Vegetabilium. The specific epithet (pachyphylla) is derived from the Ancient Greek words pachys (παχύς) meaning "thick" and phyllon (φύλλον) meaning "leaf" referring to the thickness of the leaves.

Distribution and habitat
Hakea pachyphylla has a restricted distribution occurring only in the Mount Victoria, Leura, Newnes area in swamp or heath or mallee-heath, occasionally on sandstone.

References 

pachyphylla
Flora of New South Wales